The IMOCA 60 Class yacht Saint Michel - Virbac, FRA 06 was designed by VPLP design and Guillaume Verdier and launched in the 11th September 2015 after being built  Multiplast in Vannes, France.

Racing results

Timeline

Prysmian Group - Yann Elies

StMichel-Virbac - Jean-Pierre Dick
The boat was developed under the name Absolute Dreamer 5, FRA 06.

References 

Individual sailing yachts
2010s sailing yachts
Sailboat type designs by Guillaume Verdier
Sailing yachts designed by VPLP
Sailboat types built in France
Vendée Globe boats
IMOCA 60